Limnaecia pycnogramma is a moth in the family Cosmopterigidae. It is found in Australia, where it has been recorded from New South Wales.

References

Natural History Museum Lepidoptera generic names catalog

Limnaecia
Moths described in 1918
Moths of Australia